Federico Uruburu Fernandez was a Spanish microbiologist. He was involved in early development of microbiology and electron microscopy in Spain, and was instrumental in establishing the Spanish Type Culture Collection.

References 

Spanish academics
Spanish microbiologists
1934 births
2003 deaths